The 131st New York State Legislature, consisting of the New York State Senate and the New York State Assembly, met from January 1 to June 11, 1908, during the second year of Charles Evans Hughes's governorship, in Albany.

Background
Under the provisions of the New York Constitution of 1894, re-apportioned in 1906 and 1907, 51 Senators and 150 assemblymen were elected in single-seat districts; senators for a two-year term, assemblymen for a one-year term. The senatorial districts were made up of entire counties, except New York County (twelve districts), Kings County (eight districts), Erie County (three districts) and Monroe County (two districts). The Assembly districts were made up of contiguous area, all within the same county.

On April 27, 1906, the Legislature re-apportioned the Senate districts, increasing the number to 51. The apportionment was then contested in the courts.

The Legislature also re-apportioned the number of assemblymen per county. Nassau County was separated from the remainder of Queens County; Albany, Broome, Cattaraugus, Cayuga, Onondaga, Oswego and Rensselaer counties lost one seat each; Erie, Monroe and Westchester gained one each; and Kings and Queens counties gained two each.

On April 3, 1907, the new Senate and Assembly apportionment was declared unconstitutional by the New York Court of Appeals.

On July 26, 1907, the Legislature again re-apportioned the Senate districts, and re-enacted the 1906 Assembly apportionment.

At this time there were two major political parties: the Republican Party and the Democratic Party. The Independence League, the Socialist Party and the Prohibition Party also nominated tickets.

Elections
The New York state election, 1907, was held on November 5. The only two statewide elective offices up for election were two judgeships on the New York Court of Appeals which were carried by a Republican and a Democrat both of which had been endorsed by the other major party.

Sessions
The Legislature met for the regular session at the State Capitol in Albany on January 1, 1908; and adjourned on April 23.

James Wolcott Wadsworth, Jr. (R) was re-elected Speaker.

The Legislature met for a special session at the State Capitol in Albany on May 11, 1908; and adjourned on June 11. This session was called to consider enacting reform legislation which had been recommended by the governor at the beginning of the session, but was ignored by the Legislature. Among the measures advocated by the governor were an anti-horse-race-track-gambling bill (enacted as the Hart–Agnew Law), a plan to extend the jurisdiction of the Public Service Commission to the telephone and telegraph companies, and a ballot reform.

State Senate

Districts
Note: The senators had been elected to a two-year term in November 1906 under the 1906 apportionment, as stated below. Although the Legislature re-apportioned the Senate districts in 1907, the first senatorial election under the new apportionment occurred in November 1908.

Members
The asterisk (*) denotes members of the previous Legislature who continued in office as members of this Legislature.

Employees
 Clerk: Lafayette B. Gleason

State Assembly
Note: For brevity, the chairmanships mentioned omit the words "...the Committee on (the)..."

Assemblymen

Employees
 Clerk: Ray B. Smith
 Sergeant-at-Arms: Frank W. Johnston
 Stenographer: Henry C. Lammert
Postoffice Messenger: James H. Underwood

Notes

Sources
 Official New York from Cleveland to Hughes by Charles Elliott Fitch (Hurd Publishing Co., New York and Buffalo, 1911, Vol. IV; see pg. 355f for assemblymen; and 366 for senators)
 DEMOCRATS GAIN SIX ASSEMBLYMEN in NYT on November 6, 1907
 REVISED LIST OF ASSEMBLYMEN in Johnstown Republican on November 14, 1907
 ASSEMBLY MACHINE RIDES OVER BAXTER in NYT on January 1, 1908
 WADSWORTH NAMES HIS COMMITTEES in NYT on January 7, 1908
 GOVERNOR HISSED, CALLS EXTRA SESSION in NYT on April 24, 1908

131
1908 in New York (state)
1908 U.S. legislative sessions